Crobylophora staterias is a moth of the family Stathmopodidae first described by Edward Meyrick in 1905. It is found in India and Sri Lanka.

References

Moths of Asia
Moths described in 1913
Lyonetiidae